Riddle is a 2013 American mystery crime drama film directed by John O. Hartman and Nicholas Mross and starring Elisabeth Harnois, Val Kilmer, Diora Baird and William Sadler.

Synopsys

Cast
Elisabeth Harnois as Holly Teller
Val Kilmer as Sheriff Richards
Diora Baird as Amber Richards
Ryan Malgarini as Nathan Teller
William Sadler as Western Man/Jack Abel
Bryan Lillis as Matt Caldwell
Ben Bledsoe as Cameron Bronson
Jack Erdie as Disheveled Man/Gene Bristol
Bingo O'Malley as Hal

Production

Reception

References

External links
 

2013 films
American mystery films
American crime drama films
2010s mystery films
2010s English-language films
2010s American films